Tynycwm Halt railway station served the town of Risca, Monmouthshire, Wales, from 1935 to 1962 on the Monmouthshire Railway.

History 
The station was opened on 17 April 1935 by the Great Western Railway. It closed on 30 April 1962.

References 

Disused railway stations in Caerphilly County Borough
History of Monmouthshire
Former Great Western Railway stations
Railway stations in Great Britain opened in 1935
Railway stations in Great Britain closed in 1962
1935 establishments in Wales
1962 disestablishments in Wales